Niels Fuglsang (born 29 June 1985) is a Danish politician who was elected as a Member of the European Parliament in 2019.

Education
Fuglsang has a cand.scient.pol. and in 2019 he was writing his ph.d. thesis.

Political career
As part of the parliamentary group Progressive Alliance of Socialists and Democrats, Fuglsang has since been serving on the Committee on Employment and Social Affairs and the Committee on Industry, Research and Energy.

In addition to his committee assignments, Fuglsang is part of the parliament's delegation for relations with China. He is also a member of the European Parliament Intergroup on the Welfare and Conservation of Animals,

References

External links
 Official website

MEPs for Denmark 2019–2024
1985 births
Living people
University of Copenhagen alumni